Andries Carl Nel is the Deputy Minister for Cooperative Governance and Traditional Affairs in the Republic of South Africa. He was the Deputy Minister for Constitutional Development from May 2009 until 9 July 2013 and has been a member of Parliament for the African National Congress (ANC) since 1994.

Education
Nel holds a Bachelor of Civil Law from the University of Pretoria.

Political career
Mr Nel served as Whip of Portfolio Committee on Justice and House Whip from 2000 to 2002. Between 2006 and 2007 he served as Acting Chief Whip of the African National Congress (ANC) and as a Chairperson of House of the National Assembly between 2008 and 2009.

He has served as Deputy Chief Whip of the ANC from 2002 to 2008, a member of Portfolio Committees on Justice and Constitutional Development, Correctional Services, Health, Home Affairs, Communications, and the Standing Committee on Public Accounts (SCOPA). He has also served in various Ad hoc committees as well as internal parliamentary committees such as the Rules, Joint Rules and Programme Committees, the Chief Whips' Forum and Parliamentary Oversight Authority.

Mr Nel has been involved in the National Union of South Africa Students, South African Student Press Union, Students for a Democratic Society, Students for Human Rights and the End Conscription Campaign. He was active in politics since high school in São Paulo, Brazil.

He has also served on the Constitutional Assembly Committee dealing with the judiciary and legal system and was a Co-ordinator of the Legal and Monitoring Team and ANC National Elections Team.

Mr Nel was a member of the National Executive Committee of the ANC Youth League from 1996 to 2001; Co-ordinator of the Lawyers for Human Rights' Capital Punishment and Penal Reform Project from 1990 to 1994 and a member of ANC structures at the branch and regional level in the Pretoria area.

See also

African Commission on Human and Peoples' Rights
Constitution of South Africa
History of the African National Congress
Politics in South Africa
Provincial governments of South Africa

References

External links
Profile on SA Parliament website

1965 births
African National Congress politicians
Living people
Members of the National Assembly of South Africa
University of Pretoria alumni